The 2020–21 Florida A&M Rattlers basketball team represented Florida A&M University in the 2020–21 NCAA Division I men's basketball season. The Rattlers, led by fourth-year head coach Robert McCullum, played their home games at the Al Lawson Center in Tallahassee, Florida as members of the Mid-Eastern Athletic Conference. With the creation of divisions to cut down on travel due to the COVID-19 pandemic, they played in the Southern division. They finished the season 8–12, 7–5 in MEAC play to finish in second place in the Southern division. They lost to Morgan State in the quarterfinals of the MEAC tournament.

The season marked the final season for Florida A&M as members of the MEAC as they rejoined the Southwestern Athletic Conference in 2021.

Previous season
The Rattlers finished the 2019–20 season 12–15, 10–6 in MEAC play to finish in a tie for fourth place. Florida A&M was ineligible for postseason play due to improper certification of student-athletes.

Roster

Schedule and results 

|-
!colspan=12 style=| Non-conference regular season

|-
!colspan=9 style=| MEAC regular season

|-
!colspan=9 style=| MEAC tournament

|-

Sources

References

Florida A&M Rattlers basketball seasons
Florida AandM Rattlers
Florida AandM Rattlers basketball
Florida AandM Rattlers basketball